Captain Richard Gustav Borgelin (10 February 1887 – 8 December 1966) was a Danish officer and company commander of the Danish-Baltic Auxiliary Corps (DBAC) in 1919 during the Estonian and Latvian War of Independence.

Borgelin attended and successfully ended his education at the Royal Danish Military Academy in 1909. In 1919, when Borgelin was officer of the reserve and in charge of the Second Regiment Corporal School at the Værløse Camp in northern Zealand, he was given the offer of becoming company commander of a combat unit consisting of 200 men. In the spring of 1919, Borgelin and his Compagnie Borgelin arrived in Estonia with 12 Danish officers, 12 Danish junior officers and 189 Danish privates. The company participated in the Estonian and Latvian War of Independence under Estonian army command until 1 September 1919, when the contract expired and the company was disbanded.

Borgelin and seven other Danes were awarded the Latvian military Order of Lāčplēsis of third class. In gratitude for his services to the Estonian state, Borgelin was granted Maidla manor in Estonia.

Awards and decorations

References 

1887 births
1966 deaths
People from Herning Municipality
Danish military officers
Recipients of the Order of Lāčplēsis, 3rd class
Recipients of the Cross of Liberty (Estonia)
Recipients of the Military Order of the Cross of the Eagle, Class III
People of the Estonian War of Independence
People of the Russian Civil War